The Taipei Trade and Economic Representative Office in Ulaanbaatar  is the representative office of Taiwan in Mongolia, functioning as a de facto embassy in the absence of diplomatic relations.

The Taiwan External Trade Development Council previously established a Taiwan Trade Center in June 2002.

Its counterpart is the Ulaanbaatar Trade and Economic Representative Office in Taipei, which was established in December 2003.

See also
 List of diplomatic missions of Taiwan 
 List of diplomatic missions in Mongolia
 Mongolia–Taiwan relations

References

Taiwan
Mongolia
Mongolia–Taiwan relations
2003 establishments in Mongolia
Organizations based in Ulaanbaatar